Relayted is the first studio album by Minneapolis indie rock collective Gayngs. It was released via Jagjaguwar on May 11, 2010. Inspired by 10cc's "I'm Not in Love", every song on the album was recorded at 69 BPM. On May 14, 2010, the album release show was held at First Avenue. The album peaked at number 27 on Billboards Heatseekers Albums chart. As of 2011, it has sold 13,000 copies.

Critical reception

At Metacritic, which assigns a weighted average score out of 100 to reviews from mainstream critics, Relayted received an average score of 78, based on 13 reviews, indicating "generally favorable reviews".

Steven Hyden of The A.V. Club gave the album a grade of B+, calling it "a record fueled by the soft-rock solipsism of 10cc and loads of antidepressants." Barry Nicolson of The Skinny gave the album 4 stars out of 5, saying: "Dipping its toe in everything from soft-rock to hip-hop to R&B and sixties soul, the songs all manage the trick of sounding roughly the same, completely unique, and uniformly superb."

NME placed Relayted at number 13 on the "75 Best Albums of 2010" list. Pitchfork placed "The Gaudy Side of Town" at number 99 on the "Top 100 Tracks of 2010" list.

Track listing

Personnel
Credits adapted from liner notes.

 Justin Vernon – vocals (1, 2, 3, 4, 6, 7, 8, 9, 11), guitar (1, 2, 3, 4, 8, 9), Rhodes piano (8), mixing
 Zach Coulter – human beatbox (1), vocals (1, 3, 7, 10), keyboards (1, 4, 11), piano (4), guitar (6)
 Michael Lewis – saxophone (1, 2, 4, 5, 8, 11)
 Phil Cook – electric piano (1), vocals (3), guitar (3), keyboards (4, 6, 7, 9, 10, 11)
 Brad Cook – bass guitar (1, 7, 9, 11)
 James Buckley – phone call (1), organ (5), bass guitar (11)
 Joe Westerlund – drums (1, 2, 3, 4, 5, 6, 7, 8, 9, 10, 11), vocals (8)
 Ivan Howard – vocals (2, 9, 11), piano (6)
 Nick Ryan – guitar (2, 8)
 Shön Troth – slide guitar (2, 6, 7)
 Jake Luck – keyboards (2, 7, 9), organ (4), trumpet (5)
 Nate Vernon – gun (2)
 Amish Kids – chainsaw (2)
 Danny Krzykowski – guitar (3)
 Grant Cutler – vocals (3)
 Maggie Morrison – vocals (3, 9, 11), electric piano (10)
 Adam Hurlbert – bass guitar (4, 6, 7, 8, 9, 10, 11), keyboards (5)
 Xander – piano (4)
 Channy Moon Casselle – vocals (4, 6, 9)
 Maggie Wander – vocals (4, 9)
 LeRon – vocals (4)
 Joe Mabbott – vocals (5)
 Mike Noyce – vocals (6, 9)
 Katy Morley – vocals (9)
 Ryan Olson – bass guitar (7, 11), programming, sequencing, arrangement
 Bruce Templeton – mastering
 Michael Gaughan – painting
 Eric Carlson – logo
 Daniel Murphy – layout

Charts

References

External links
 
 Relayted at Jagjaguwar

2010 debut albums
Jagjaguwar albums
Gayngs albums